is a 2014 Japanese feature-special directed by Nobuhiro Doi. It is based on the novel "Nemuri no Mori" by Keigo Higashino.

Plot
A man is found dead in an office of the Takayanagi Ballet Company. The suspect, who a dancer in the company, is found lying down unconscious in the same room. According to the suspect, the man was a robber who had tried to attack her. She insists that in self-defence, she hit him on the head and killed him. After a series of investigations, suspicions surrounding her clam begins to surface. Later on, the director of the Takayanagi Ballet Company is poisoned to death. Are the cases related?

Cast
 Hiroshi Abe as Kyoichiro Kaga
 Satomi Ishihara as Mio Asaoka
 Kei Otozuki as Akiko Takayanagi
 Haruka Kinami as Haruko Saito
 Eiko Otani as Yasuko Morii
 Akira Emoto as Saisuke Ota
 Asahi Uchida as Toshiyuki Kazama

Special Appearance by Yukie Nakama
At the beginning of the story, Kaga attends a ballet show with an omiai date arranged by his boss. His date, named Yamada, is played by Yukie Nakama. This is a cross reference to Hiroshi Abe and Yukie Nakama's respective lead roles as Jiro Ueda and Naoko Yamada in the famous mystery comedy series Trick. Kaga falls asleep and snores aloud during the show, which causes Yamada to turn him down. She does not appear in the story again.

See also
 Shinzanmono
 The Wings of the Kirin

References

External links
  
 

Films directed by Nobuhiro Doi
2014 television films
Japanese television films
Films based on Japanese novels
Films based on works by Keigo Higashino
TBS Television (Japan) original programming
Television shows based on works by Keigo Higashino
2010s Japanese films